The military alliance between the United Kingdom and Poland was formalised by the Anglo-Polish Agreement in 1939, with subsequent addenda of 1940 and 1944, for mutual assistance in case of a military invasion from Nazi Germany, as specified in a secret protocol.

Background
The United Kingdom had been attempting to create a four-way alliance to contain Germany, with France, Poland and the Soviet Union. Poland's Jozef Beck was disturbed by the prospect of any alliance with the Soviets. He also feared the reaction of Berlin to the four-way alliance, which might be seen as the encirclement of Germany. Beck, however, saw an opportunity and so he proposed a secret agreement on consultation to British Foreign Secretary Lord Halifax that was received on 24th March, 1939. When questioned by Halifax, Polish Foreign Minister Edward Bernard Raczyński said that he thought that Beck had British aid in mind in the event of an attack on Poland, but it would not be a mutual agreement.

British assurance to Poland
On 31 March 1939, in response to Nazi Germany's defiance of the Munich Agreement and its occupation of Czechoslovakia, in Parliament, the United Kingdom pledged the support of itself and France to assure Polish independence:

The British Chiefs of Staff at the time however noted that "we could give no direct help by land, sea or air."

On 6 April, during a visit to London by the Polish foreign minister, it was agreed to formalise the assurance as an Anglo–Polish military alliance, pending negotiations. The text of the "Anglo-Polish Communiqué" stated that the two governments were "in complete agreement on certain general principles" and that it was "agreed that the two countries were prepared to enter into an agreement of permanent and reciprocal character...". The British Blue Book for 1939 indicates that formal agreement was not signed until 25 August.

That assurance was extended on 13 April to Greece and Romania, after Italy's invasion of Albania.

Agreement of Mutual Assistance

On 25 August, two days after the Molotov–Ribbentrop Pact, the Agreement of Mutual Assistance between the United Kingdom and Poland was signed. The agreement contained promises of mutual military assistance between the nations if either was attacked by some "European country". The United Kingdom, sensing a trend of German expansionism, sought to discourage German aggression by this show of solidarity. In a secret protocol of the pact, the United Kingdom offered assistance in the case of an attack on Poland specifically by Germany, but in the case of attack by other countries, the parties were required only to "consult together on measures to be taken in common". Both the United Kingdom and Poland were bound not to enter agreements with any other third countries that were a threat to the other. Because of the pact's signing, Hitler postponed his planned invasion of Poland from 26 August until 1 September.

Failed Soviet-Franco-British alliance

After the German occupation of Prague in March 1939 in violation of the Munich agreement, the Chamberlain government in Britain sought Soviet and French support for a Peace Front. The goal was to deter further German aggression by guaranteeing the independence of Poland and Romania. However, Stalin refused to pledge Soviet support for the guarantees unless Britain and France first concluded a military alliance with the Soviet Union. Although the British cabinet decided to seek such an alliance, the western negotiators in Moscow in August 1939 lacked urgency. The talks were conducted poorly and slowly by diplomats with little authority, such as William Strang, an assistant under-secretary. Stalin also insisted on British and French guarantees to Finland, the Baltic states, Poland and Romania against indirect German aggression. Those countries, however, became fearful that Moscow wanted to control them.  Although Hitler was escalating threats against Poland, which refused to allow Soviet troops to cross its borders for fear that they would never leave. Historian Michael Jabara Carley argues that the British were too committed to anticommunism to trust Stalin.

Meanwhile, both Great Britain and USSR were separately involved into secret negotiations with Germany. Eventually Stalin was attracted to a much better deal by Hitler, the control of most of Eastern Europe, and decided to sign the Molotov-Ribbentrop Pact.

Polish–British Naval Agreement 
Ever since it had been sent to Britain in mid-1939 in Operation Peking, the Polish Navy remained in British waters. In November 1939, after the Invasion of Poland, the Polish-British Naval Agreement allowed Polish sailors to wear their Polish uniforms and to have Polish commanding officers on board even though the ships were of British make. The agreement would later be revised on August 5, 1940 to encompass all Polish units.

Anglo-Polish Agreement Respecting Polish Land and Air Forces
On August 5, 1940, an agreement was signed that "the Polish Armed Forces (comprising Land, Sea, and Air Forces) shall be organized and employed under British Command" but would be "subject to Polish military law and disciplinary ruling, and they [would] be tried in Polish military courts". The only change came on 11 October 1940, when the Polish Air Force was made an exception and became subject to British discipline and laws.

Analysis
The alliance committed Britain, for the first time in history, to fight on behalf of a European country other than France or Belgium. Hitler was then demanding the cession of the Free City of Danzig, an extraterritorial highway (the Reichsautobahn Berlin-Königsberg) across the Polish Corridor and special privileges for the ethnic German minority within Poland. By the terms of the military alliance, both Poland and Britain were free to decide whether to oppose with force any territorial encroachment, as the pact did not include any statement of either party's commitment to the defence of the other party's territorial integrity. However, there were provisions regarding "indirect threats" and attempts to undermine either party's independence by means of "economic penetration" in a clear reference to the German demands.

In May 1939, Poland signed a secret protocol to the 1921 Franco-Polish Military Alliance, but it was not ratified by France until 4 September.

On 17 September, the Soviet Union invaded Poland through the eastern Polish border in keeping with the Molotov–Ribbentrop Pact's secret protocol specifying the division of Poland. According to the Polish-British Common Defence Pact, the United Kingdom should give Poland "all the support and assistance in its power" if Poland was "engaged in hostilities with a European Power in consequence of aggression by the latter". The Polish ambassador in London, Edward Bernard Raczyński, contacted the British Foreign Office to point out that clause 1(b) of the agreement, which concerned an "aggression by a European power" on Poland, should apply to the Soviet invasion. Halifax responded that the obligation of British government towards Poland that arose out of the Anglo-Polish Agreement was restricted to Germany, according to the first clause of the secret protocol.

Criticism

The Polish historian Paweł Wieczorkiewicz wrote, "Polish leaders were not aware of the fact that England and France were not ready for war. They needed time to catch up with the Third Reich, and were determined to gain the time at any price". The publicist Stanisław Mackiewicz stated in the late 1940s, "To accept London's guarantees was one of the most tragic dates in the history of Poland. It was a mental aberration and madness". On the same day that Britain pledged its support of Poland, Lord Halifax stated, "We do not think this guarantee will be binding". Another British diplomat, Alexander Cadogan, wrote in his diary: "Naturally, our guarantee does not give any help to Poland. It can be said that it was cruel to Poland, even cynical".

Polish-British military negotiations were carried out in London but ended up in a fiasco. After lengthy talks, the British reluctantly pledged to bomb German military and installations if the Germans carried out attacks of that kind in Poland. Polish military leaders failed to obtain any other promises. At the same time, the Polish side negotiated a military loan. The Polish ambassador to Britain, Edward Raczyński, called the negotiations "a never-ending nightmare". Józef Beck wrote in his memoirs, "The negotiations, carried out in London by Colonel Adam Koc, immediately turned into theoretical discussion about our financial system. It was clear that Sir John Simon and Frederick Leith-Ross did not realize the gravity of the situation. They negotiated in purely financial terms, without consideration for the rules of the wartime alliance. As a result, the English offer gave us no grounds for quick reinforcement of our army".

On 2 August 1939, Britain finally agreed to grant Poland a military loan of £9 million, which was less than Turkey received at the same time. Poland had asked for a loan of £60 million.

See also
 International relations (1919–1939)
 Franco-Polish Military Alliance
 Western betrayal

Notes

References
 
 Piotr Zychowicz, Pakt Ribbentrop - Beck. Dom Wydawniczy Rebis, Poznań 2012.

Further reading
 Anita J. Prazmowska. (1987). Britain, Poland and the Eastern Front, 1939. Cambridge University Press, 
 Władysław W. Kulski. (1976). "The Anglo-Polish Agreement of August 25, 1939: Highlight of My Diplomatic Career," The Polish Review, 21 (1/2): 23–40.

1939 in Poland
1939 in the United Kingdom
Common Defence Pact
20th-century military alliances
Treaties concluded in 1939
Treaties of the Second Polish Republic
Military alliances involving Poland
Military alliances involving the United Kingdom
United Kingdom in World War II
Treaties of the United Kingdom